The Flying Wedge Award is one of the NCAA’s highest honors. It is awarded to an individual who exemplifies outstanding leadership and service to the NCAA. The flying wedge was used in the early days of American football and became a symbol of the origin of the NCAA in 1906. There is a life-size sculpture of the flying wedge in the NCAA Hall of Champions in Indianapolis and a reproduction is awarded as The Flying Wedge Award.  Ironically, the flying wedge formation was outlawed in college football in 1894 because it was highly dangerous.

The award is given by the NCAA Leadership Advisory Board of Directors and there have been ten recipients:

Richard Cheney, Vice President of the United States of America 
Thomas Curley, president and chief executive officer, The Associated Press 
Stevie Eller and Karl Eller, chairman and chief executive officer, The Eller Company 
James T. Morris, executive director, United Nations World Food Program 
Edwin A. Lupberger, president, Nesher Investments, LLC 
Reverend Edward A. Malloy, president emeritus, University of Notre Dame 
Marion B. Peavey, senior vice president for development and college relations, Wofford College, and executive director emeritus, NCAA Foundation 
George M. Steinbrenner III, principal owner, New York Yankees 
Randall L. Tobias, ambassador and former chief executive officer of Eli Lilly and Company

Sources
The Flying Wedge Award. NCAA official website

College sports trophies and awards in the United States
NCAA awards